Sanjivani College of Engineering (SRES-COE) is a (autonomous) private engineering college located in Kopargaon, Ahmednagar, Maharashtra, India.

External links
 Official website
 Sanjivani College of Pharmaceutical Education and Research
 Sanjivani KBP Polytechnic
 
 ACES Sanjivani, by Department of Computer Engineering

All India Council for Technical Education
Colleges affiliated to Savitribai Phule Pune University
Engineering colleges in Maharashtra
Education in Ahmednagar district
Educational institutions established in 1983
1983 establishments in Maharashtra